Terebayevo is a rural locality (a village) and the administrative center of Terebayevskoye Rural Settlement, Nikolsky District, Vologda Oblast, Russia. The population was 203 as of 2002.

Geography 
Terebayevo is located 22 km northwest of Nikolsk (the district's administrative centre) by road. Tarasovo is the nearest rural locality.

References 

Rural localities in Nikolsky District, Vologda Oblast